Orioli is a surname. Notable people with the surname include:

Antonio Francesco Orioli (1778–1852), Italian cardinal of the Catholic Church
Edi Orioli (born 1962), Italian rallying motorcycle racer
Giuseppe Orioli (1884–1942), Italian book publisher
Pietro di Francesco degli Orioli (approx. 1458–1496), Italian painter of the Renaissance period
Regina Orioli (born 1977), Italian actress

References